Dirk Pohlmann (born 1959) is a German journalist, author, screenwriter, director and producer of more than 20 historical documentaries for Arte, ARD and ZDF. He was a manager of CargoLifter World and ArtemiFlow, producer of Artemisinin. Dirk Pohlmann is the editor-in-chief of Free21, a German Political Blog and journal.

Since 2004, Pohlmann has increasingly focused on intelligence operations during the Cold War and after.

Life 
After his Abitur, Pohlmann studied journalism, philosophy as well as law at Johannes Gutenberg University in Mainz. In his time he was especially impressed by the Jesuit Helmut Erlinghagen who witnessed the effects of the Hiroshima bombing.

1986 Pohlmann started with the production of documentaries. After his film on CargoLifter, and after starting to work as a freelance in-house documentarian, he became a manager of CargoLifter World. It went into insolvency with its parent company Cargolifter in 2002. Pohlmann attributed the difficult situation of Cargolifter mainly to the German media, and the unpreparedness of politicians in Germany, leaving business in the end to US companies. After the "initial hype" about CargoLifter, the media in Germany had "howled in chorus like a pack of wolves" and had produced only variations of one false claim: "CargoLifter must fail, because airships are a harebrained idea." Loss of reality and absence of diversity are a basic problem of today's German media. They align their assessments with the  reporting of leading media, i.e. among themselves, instead of reality.In his time with CargoLifter, Pohlman received training as a project manager.

After 2012, he was manager of Peter Seeberger's pharmaceutical company ArtemiFlow for the production of the antimalarial drug Artemisin.

Documentaries 
Pohlmann produced documentaries for arte and ZDF. These include, among others, (titles translated into English) The Secret Air War of the Superpowers (arte, 2004), UFOs, Lies and the Cold War (arte, 2005), Mengele's Heirs''' (arte, 2010), Israel and the Bomb (arte/ZDF, 2012) and Deception – Reagan's Method (2014).

 Cooperation with alternative media 
He has regularly published his own contributions at KenFM. Since March 2018, Pohlmann has hosted a critique of Wikipedia with former biology teacher Markus Fiedler in Fiedler's series Stories from Wikihausen, which has appeared on their eponymous YouTube channel since April 2019.Thomas Urban: Fachkräftemangel. In: Süddeutsche Zeitung, 5 October 2019, p. 12/13. (online, paywall) With Robert Fleischer and Mathias Bröckers he hosts the video channel The 3rd Millennium on ExoMagazinTV.

Pohlmann frequently contributes to German alternative media. He was a guest in programmes of RT Deutsch and Sputnik News.

 Criticism of Wikipedia 
In 2018 he gained public attention in Germany with his criticism of political networks within Wikipedia. A preliminary injunction against a group of Wikipedia critics concerning him, among others, because they had disclosed the identity of a Wikipedia author, was lifted in early 2019. In doing so, the court had followed the view that the "applicant was editing Wikipedia articles in an opinionated manner" and thus the user's disclosure had been in the public interest. In January 2021, the Süddeutsche Zeitung reported that Fiedler and Pohlmann had named another volunteer Wikipedia author and local politician in a video because of a correction in a Wikipedia article with real name, photo, phone number and email address and called to "tell him what you think of his activities". Subsequently, threats were made against the author.Günter Hiel: "Konzertierter Verleumdungsangriff gegen mich." Wikipedia opponents attack Haar's second mayor [name] as author of the online encyclopedia, Münchner Merkur, publication date Friday, 22 January 2021, page 29

 Reception 
Pohlmann was characterized in a ZDFinfo report in November 2019 as an "activist who thinks the U.S. is warmongering," and that "the Western media are not neutral, but propaganda instruments of NATO." The report mentioned that Pohlmann thought the military option was "the mindset of the Americans, that is, from the American point of view, war is a very profitable business." Sächsische Zeitung wrote in May 2021: "Dirk Pohlmann is particularly well-versed in his self-portrayal as a universal expert with a downright Goethe style, who actually contributes some kind of specialist "knowledge" to everything: Navalny, Middle East conflict, Green Party, Assassination of Olof Palme, whales, ravens ... ".

 Filmography 

 1996: Kurklinik Rosenau
 2000: Heimatfront (series of three parts)
 2000: Soldaten hinter Stacheldraht (part of Heimatfront)
 2003: Abschuss über der Sowjetunion – Der geheime Luftkrieg der Supermächte
 2004: Zeitreisen – Geschichte entdecken (series of three parts)
 2004: Der geheime Luftkrieg der Supermächte
 2005: Ufos, Lügen und der Kalte Krieg
 2005: In feindlichen Tiefen – Der geheime U-Boot-Krieg der Supermächte (also known as Der geheime U-Boot-Krieg der Supermächte – Deutschland)
 2006: ZDF Expeditionen – Magische Welten (TV series, Shangri-La – Spurensuche in Tibet'')
 2006: Hinter den feindlichen Linien – Geheimoperationen im Kalten Krieg
 2007: Kriegsbeute Mensch – Wie Regierungen ihre Soldaten verraten
 2007: Ich wollte nicht mehr aufstehen – Neue Forschung gegen Depressionen
 2008: Der Zuckercode – Geheimwaffe gegen Krebs und Malaria?
 2009: Geheimnis Area 51 – MiGs im Sperrgebiet
 2010: Mengeles Erben – Menschenexperimente im kalten Krieg
 2011: Tod in der Tiefe – Schlagabtausch der Supermächte
 2012: Israel und die Bombe – Ein radioaktives Tabu
 2013: Dienstbereit – Nazis und Faschisten im Dienste der CIA (with Florian Hartung)
 2014: Täuschung – Die Methode Reagan
 2016: Transportgiganten – Das Comeback der Luftschiffe (with Cornelia Borrmann and Felix Krüger, in Ozon Unterwegs, rbb, 25. April 2016)
 2016: Europas größte Marsmission (with Cornelia Borrmann)
 2017: Dickkopfs Doppelspiel

Bibliography

References

External links 

 
 
 Website

Living people
1959 births
21st-century German journalists
20th-century German journalists